WKHG (104.9 FM) is a radio station broadcasting a hot adult contemporary format. Licensed to Leitchfield, Kentucky, United States, the station is currently owned by Heritage Media of Kentucky, Inc., and features programming from Fox News Radio and Fox Sports Radio.

History 
The station signed on the air as WMTL-FM on October 29, 1967. It first served as a full-time FM repeater of sister station WMTL for its first 11 years on the air. In 1978, the station became a separate entity when the FM station's callsign was changed to the current WKHG, renamed for Judge Kenneth H. Goff, then-president of Rough River Broadcasting, and began broadcasting its current hot adult contemporary format.

From 1999 until 2012, the station also broadcast the NFL's Tennessee Titans football games from the Tennessee Titans Radio Network.

Programming 
In addition to its usual hot AC music playlist, WKHG, along with sister station WMTL are also the main radio outlets of Grayson County High School football and boys' and girls' basketball game broadcasts. WKHG also broadcasts Kentucky Wildcats football and men's basketball games from the UK Sports Network. Syndicated programming includes AT40 with Ryan Seacrest on Saturday afternoons and The Jim Brickman Show on Sunday mornings.

References

External links

KHG
Radio stations established in 1967
1967 establishments in Kentucky
Hot adult contemporary radio stations in the United States
Leitchfield, Kentucky